Kamal Pokhari is a historic pond in Kathmandu, Nepal. The history of the pond is uncertain possibly dating back to the Licchavi-era and it had been used by the Malla kings. Kamal Pokhari had restored by Kathmandu Metropolitan City. The restoration project has received protests for using concrete which "deteriorates the originality of the traditional pond in the capital city".

References 

Kathmandu
Ponds in Kathmandu Valley